This is a list of electoral results for the electoral district of Reservoir in Victorian state elections.

Members for Reservoir

Election results

Elections in the 1980s

Elections in the 1970s

Elections in the 1960s

 The two candidate preferred vote was not counted between the Labor and DLP candidates for Reservoir.

Elections in the 1950s

 Two party preferred vote was estimated.

References

Victoria (Australia) state electoral results by district